Christopher Warren Flanagan (born 7 May 1964) is a New Zealand cricketer. He played in 21 first-class and 27 List A matches for Canterbury from 1986 to 1995.

A left-arm medium-pace bowler and useful batsman in the lower order, Flanagan's best first-class bowling figures were 6 for 30 and 5 for 37 in Canterbury's 48-run victory over Auckland in December 1993. Eight of his eleven victims were out leg before wicket. Playing for High School Old Boys in the Christchurch senior competition in 1996-97, Flanagan took figures of 10 for 8 in an innings against Sydenham, the best figures in the competition's history.

See also
 List of Canterbury representative cricketers

References

External links
 

1964 births
Living people
New Zealand cricketers
Canterbury cricketers
Cricketers from Christchurch